This is a list of members of the South Australian House of Assembly from 1950 to 1953, as elected at the 1950 state election:

 The LCL member for Flinders, Rex Pearson, resigned on 22 March 1951 to run for the Australian Senate at the 1951 federal election. His son, Glen Pearson, won the resulting by-election for the LCL on 2 June 1951.
 The Labor member for Gawler, Leslie Duncan, died on 27 February 1952. Labor candidate John Clark won the resulting by-election on 19 April 1952.
 The LCL member for Stirling, Herbert Dunn, died on 11 September 1952. LCL candidate William Jenkins won the resulting by-election on 18 October 1952.

Members of South Australian parliaments by term
20th-century Australian politicians